Kate Price is a hammered dulcimer player and vocalist born in Salt Lake City, Utah.  She has made recordings on several labels, including Priceless Productions, Access Music, Higher Octave / Om Town, Narada Productions, and LunaVerse Music.
Price's music fuses folk music with elements of classical, jazz, and ethnic music, using instruments from around the world.

Discography

Solo
The Kitchen Table Archives (2015)
Songs From The Witches Wood (2009)

The Isle of Dreaming (2000)

Deep Heart’s Core (Priceless Productions, 1995; reissued in 1997 by Higher Octave)

The Time Between (1993)

Belaich an' Doran (1991)
Dreams of Annwyn (1989)
Not Far from here (1987)
Hungry Moon (1984)

Collaborations
With Kenny Loggins
Leap of Faith - Background Vocals
Return to Pooh Corner - Background Vocals
Yesterday, Today, Tomorrow - Background Vocals (The Greatest Hits' Album)
December - Performer
With Dennis Schaecher
Road to Reunion - Vocals
Compilation albums
Americana Series:Appalachian Aire - Vocals
Extraordinaire Americana Collection - Vocals
Americana Series - Instrumental
A Very Green Christmas - Instrumental
Night and Day : Higher Octave - Vocal

References
Ectoguide
Harmony Ridge Music
Rambles Magazine

External links
Official website

Hammered dulcimer players
American women singers
Living people
Year of birth missing (living people)
Narada Productions artists
Musicians from Salt Lake City
21st-century American women